Osterley is a rural locality in the local government area (LGA) of Central Highlands in the Central LGA region of Tasmania. The 2016 census recorded a population of 12 for the state suburb of Osterley.

History 
Osterley was gazetted as a locality in 1973. The name was in use for a Town Reserve by 1845, but the locality was known as Native Tier until 1892.

Geography
The River Ouse forms the eastern boundary.

Road infrastructure 
Route C173 (Victoria Valley Road) runs through from south to south-west.

References

Towns in Tasmania
Localities of Central Highlands Council